The 1874 North Hampshire by-election was fought on 14 March 1874.  The byelection was fought due to the incumbent Conservative MP, George Sclater-Booth, becoming President of the Local Government Board.  It was retained by the incumbent.

References

1874 elections in the United Kingdom
1874 in England
19th century in Hampshire
March 1874 events
By-elections to the Parliament of the United Kingdom in Hampshire constituencies
Unopposed ministerial by-elections to the Parliament of the United Kingdom in English constituencies